Dou Dan (born 20 January 1993) is a Chinese boxer.

She won a medal at the 2019 AIBA Women's World Boxing Championships.

References

1993 births
Living people
AIBA Women's World Boxing Championships medalists
Chinese women boxers
Light-welterweight boxers
World light-welterweight boxing champions